Balestrero may refer to

 Christopher Emmanuel Balestrero (1909–1998), the person on whom the movie The Wrong Man (1956) is based
 Ettore Balestrero (born 1966), a diplomat of the Holy See
 Gregory Balestrero (born 1947), American industrial engineer
 Renato Balestrero (1898–1948), Italian racing car driver